Oaxacanthaxia is a genus of beetles in the family Buprestidae, containing the following species:

 Oaxacanthaxia aenea Hornburg & Gottwald, 2008
 Oaxacanthaxia bicolorata Bellamy, 2011
 Oaxacanthaxia nigroaenea Nelson & MacRae, 1994
 Oaxacanthaxia vandenberghei Niehuis & Gottwald, 2006
 Oaxacanthaxia viridis Bellamy, 1990

References

Buprestidae genera